Jay Adair (born 1969/1970) is an American billionaire businessman, and the chief executive officer (CEO) of Copart, a car salvage company founded by his father-in-law, Willis Johnson.

Adair started at Copart as a manager in 1989 at the age of 19. In 1998, Adair pioneered Copart's move into online auctions, and by 2003, the company put auctions 100% online. Adair has been a board member of Copart since September 1992.

Adair became the CEO of Copart, taking over Willis Johnson as he stepped down, in February 2010. He owns shares in the company worth more than $800 million.

Adair is married to Tammi, daughter of Willis Johnson, and they have two children. They own a Suisun Valley vineyard in California.

References

Living people
American chief executives
American winemakers
Year of birth missing (living people)
American billionaires